The New Adventures of Figaro Pho is an Australian children's animated television series. It is the 2015 sequel to the 2012 series The Adventures of Figaro Pho.

Synopsis
Both series are about Figaro Pho, a character with every known phobia. One unique attribute also shared among franchises of the series is that there is almost no dialogue at all. Instead the shows require strong animated physical-performance-based drama, music score and sound effects to carry the story.

Figaro Pho has been the star of his own two-season television series as well as an anthology series of 26 90-second shorts and three touchscreen games.

Broadcast
The first series is available in over 100 countries on Hulu, Netflix, Cartoon Network Latin America, Pakapaka, BBC Canada and iTunes. In Canada it airs on both Family Channel and CHRGD.

Creation
Figaro Pho is the brainchild of creator and animation director Luke Jurevicius. The TV series and the games are produced by Australian production company Chocolate Liberation Front.

Creator Luke Jurevicius suffers from fears and phobias himself, and drew a lot on personal experience in the creation of the series. Jurevicius not only directs the program, but he also performs many of the key roles including doing the voice of Figaro Pho and composing a large part of the music.

The original shorts were first commissioned by the South Australian Film Corporation and The Australian Broadcasting Corporation’s New Media and Digital Services Division as an innovative property for broadcast on ABC2 and online at ABC Online. The program was eventually produced for broadcast on ABC1, ABC2, ABC3, ABC iView. Following the success of the original shorts, ABC Kids commissioned 39 episodes of The Adventures of Figaro Pho for ABC3.

In 2014 producers Chocolate Liberation Front formed a partnership with Luma Toons, a new branch of the leading SFX studio Luma Pictures, to produce 39 episodes for the second series entitled The New Adventures of Figaro Pho.  The program, which was entirely produced in Australia, was the first long form series produced by Luma.

The New Adventures of Figaro Pho started airing in August 2015.

Games 
In 2014 ABC Commercial published a series of three Figaro Pho branded games for touch screen devices.  These games are available through iTunes and the Google Play store.

Episodes

The New Adventures of Figaro Pho episode titles 

 Figaro on Ice
 The Bag-Piped Piper
 Figarette Pho, 9 Feb 2016 debut on BBC Kids with Pho is in the Air and Time Travellers
 School of Cool
 Dr Dread
 Kung Fu Pho
 Zombie Pho, 8 February 2016 on BBC Kids with Nightmare on Edam Street
 Pho is in the Air 
 Bandage Brouhaha, 10 February 2016 on BBC Kids
 Tiny Terrors (11 Feb 2016 debut on BBC with The Soup)
 Nightmare on Edam Street
 Flower of Fury 
 Myth or Pho? 
 Vertigo Pho
 Spider Pho
 Loose Tooth, 24 Feb 2016 on BBC with  Gumball Boogie
 Time Traveller
 Mailman Mania
 FrankenRivet
 Gumball Boogie
 Pizza Boy
 Neat Freak
 Eye Witless
 Laugh Attack
 The Soup
 Baby Bandit, 22 February 2016 BBC Kids debut with Laugh Attack and The Bag-Pied Piper
 Run Figaro Run! 9 March 2016 on Family
 Party Pooper (BBC Kids debuted 20 Feb 2016 with Valentine's Day and Mailman Mania) 18 March 2017 on Family
 Waltergeist
 Stage Fright, 11 March 2016 on Family
 Valentine's Day
 Fame Game, 20 April 2016 on Family
 The Grim Reaper
 Double Pho, 19 April 2016 on Family
 Pharaoh Pho, 8 March 2016 on Family
 Cup Cake Carnage, 14 March 2016 on Family
 Figaro's Big Adventure, 15 March 2016 on Family
 Odd Socks, 16 March 2016 on Family, guide lists.as "Old Socks"
 Camp Fear, 10 March 2016 on Family

Reception

The series has been compared favorably to animation from Tim Burton. The series has been recognized for its humour, music and its stunning animation and special effects.  It has won numerous awards around the world including being named 2014’s Best Children’s Program on three continents (Australian Academy of Cinema and Television Awards.;  The Asian Television Awards and Kidscreen New York). The program has also picked up awards for writing, digital effects,  animation and post production.

Cast and crew

Key cast 

 Luke Jurevicius
 Charlotte Rose Hamlyn
 Aletheia Burney
 Maggie Felton

Writers 

 Tim Bain
 Craig Behenna
 Ray Boseley
 Dan Fill
 Robert Greenberg
 Bruce Griffiths
 Charlotte Rose Hamlyn
 Mark Shirrefs
 Frank Verheggen

Producers 

 Dan Fill
 Luke Jurevicius
 Frank Verheggen

References

External links 
 Figaro Pho website

2010s Australian animated television series
2015 Australian television series debuts
Australian children's animated drama television series
Australian children's animated horror television series
Australian Broadcasting Corporation original programming